FGCI may refer to:

 Italian Communist Youth Federation (1949-1990)
 Youth Federation of Italian Communists (2004-2014)